Kim Chadwick Tribble (November 14, 1951-August 26, 2021) was an American country music songwriter.

Active since the mid-1990s, he has written for David Lee Murphy, Montgomery Gentry, Doug Stone, and others. Two songs written by Tribble, "Guys Do It All the Time" by Mindy McCready and "I Can Still Feel You" by Collin Raye, have made number 1 on the Hot Country Songs charts. Tribble signed with SESAC in 2008.

Tribble was a frequent collaborator of David Lee Murphy, having written songs on all of his albums.

Tribble died at age 69 in Nashville, Tennessee, following complications of dementia with Lewy bodies.

List of songs written by Kim Tribble

References

American country singer-songwriters
People from Muscle Shoals, Alabama
1951 births
2021 deaths
American male singer-songwriters
Singer-songwriters from Alabama
Deaths from dementia in Tennessee